The 2000–01 season was the 96th season in the existence of SC Freiburg and the club's third consecutive season in the top flight of German football. In addition to the domestic league, SC Freiburg participated in this season's edition of the DFB-Pokal. The season covered the period from 1 July 2000 to 30 June 2001.

Players

Competitions

Overview

Bundesliga

League table

Results summary

Results by round

Matches

Source:

DFB-Pokal

References

SC Freiburg seasons
SC Freiburg